Ajeltake is a town in the Marshall Islands. It is located on Majuro Atoll and occupies the southwestern section of the Atoll ring. The population numbered 1,700 in 2006.

References 

Populated places in the Marshall Islands
Majuro